Cronicombra is a genus of sedge moths.

Species
 Cronicombra essedaria
 Cronicombra granulata

References

External links
 Cronicombra at Zipcodezoo.com
 Cronicombra at Global Species

Glyphipterigidae